Algeria (ALG) competed at the 1979 Mediterranean Games in Split, Yugoslavia.

Medal summary

Medal table

References

International Mediterranean Games Committee

Nations at the 1979 Mediterranean Games
1979
Mediterranean Games